Mathieu Klein (born 20 January 1976) is a French politician serving as Mayor of Nancy since 2020.

A member of the Socialist Party since 1992, he is also President of the Departmental Council of Meurthe-et-Moselle. After the 2020 French municipal elections, he became the first socialist Mayor of Nancy since the end of the second World War.

Early life and education 
Mathieu Klein was born into a family of teachers in Phalsbourg, Moselle. Alongside his two brothers, he was brought up in Holving, before pursuing his secondary education at Sarreguemines. He moved to Nancy, France in 1993 to study history and sociology. He then continued his university studies in Paris.

Political career 
Mathieu Klein is a member of the Socialist Party since 1992 and his support in favour of a positive result in the French referendum on the Maastricht Treaty. He then became a student member of the National Union of Students of France in Nancy, then Paris becoming a member of its national bureau in charge of health matters.

In 1994 in Nancy he founded an LGBT association dedicated to the promotion of equality and fighting against homophobia.

He pursued his political career within the Socialist Party, becoming Departmental President of the Young Socialist Movement, Secretary of the Nancy branch of the Socialist Party and then, in 2008, First Secretary of Meurthe-et-Moselle branch of the party and member of its national bureau.

In 2000 he worked under the then President of the Departmental Council of Meurthe-et-Moselle, the socialist Michel Dinet, who would go on to become his political mentor. In the 2004 French departmental elections, Klein was elected Departmental Councillor of Meurthe-et-Moselle in the Nancy North constituency, winning against Senator Philippe Nachbar, a member of the UMP, in the second round with 60.7% of the vote. In the 2011 elections, Klein was reelected with 61.66% of the vote in the second round.

Following the 2002 French presidential election, he joined the New Socialist Party. In 2009, he joined the team of Martine Aubry, the then First Secretary of the Socialist Party, accompanying her candidacy in the 2011 French Socialist Party presidential primary.

In 2005, Klein contested a by-election in Meurthe-et-Moselle's 1st constituency, but was defeated by 399 votes by the incumbent Laurent Hénart. In the 2007 French legislative election, Klein stood as a candidate again and lost, obtaining 49.2% of the vote in the second round. In the 2014 French municipal elections in Nancy, Klein's list was defeated by Laurent Hénart.

Following the accidental death of his mentor Michel Dinet, he replaced him as President of the Departmental Assembly of Meurthe-et-Moselle in 2014, leaving his position as Departmental Vice-President for education and civic innovation on the Departmental Council. In the 2015 French departmental elections, Klein was elected in the Nancy 2 canton, receiving 56.7% of the vote, and returned as President of the Departmental Council.

In 2016, Klein announced his support for Manuel Valls and became one of his spokespersons during the 2017 French Socialist Party presidential primary campaign.

Following the proposal of French Prime Minister Édouard Philippe in 2018, Mathieu Klein was made responsible for a project on the professional integration of beneficiaries of the French welfare benefit Revenu de solidarité active with Claire Pitollat. In October 2018, Klein refused a ministerial position in Second Philippe government.

In the 2020 French municipal elections in Nancy, Klein headed the Nancy en grand list of the Socialist Party, which took the first place in the first round on 15 March 2020, with 37.9% of the vote. Following this result, Klein merged his list with that of Europe Ecology – The Greens. In the second round, held on 28 June 2020, Klein prevailed with 54.5% of the vote. He was confirmed as Mayor on 15 July 2020 by 43 votes in the municipal council of Nancy, becoming the first left-wing person to exercise this mandate since the end of the second World War. He is seconded by twenty adjoints au maire.

Personal life 
Mathieu Klein is a gay man and is engaged in associations which are engaged in the fight against homophobia. He is married to a general practitioner and the couple have three children.

Honours 
 Knight, National Order of Merit (2017)

References

External links 
Official website (French)

1976 births
21st-century French politicians
French people of German descent
Gay politicians
Knights of the Ordre national du Mérite
LGBT mayors of places in France
Living people
Mayors of Nancy, France
People from Moselle (department)
Socialist Party (France) politicians